Baptism is the seventh studio album by American rock musician Lenny Kravitz, released on May 17, 2004, by Virgin Records. The album produced five singles and reached number 14 on the Billboard 200 and number 74 on the UK Albums Chart.

Production
Lenny Kravitz originally intended this album to be a 1970s style funk album, simply titled The Funk Album. However, he changed his mind when he picked up an acoustic guitar to write the songs for the album. Having stated that songs started pouring out of him, Kravitz decided that his special project could wait. Instead, Kravitz recorded a more straightforward rock album similar to his 1989 album Let Love Rule. The album was recorded at Hotel Edison studios in Miami, Florida, and also features a contribution from rapper Jay-Z on the song "Storm". "Storm" was originally titled "(I Can't Make It) Another Day" and was originally recorded with Michael Jackson. Kravitz had previously played guitar on Jay-Z's album The Blueprint²: The Gift & the Curse. Kravitz had mentioned in an interview that at the time of the album's production, he was in dispute with his record label, who did not agree with his decisions to alter his project, saying that the album featured some darker material representing his stage of depression and other problems he was going through at that time.

Promotion
For the promotion of the album, Kravitz kicked off the Baptism tour in April of that year across North America. In 2005, Kravitz embarked on yet another tour called The Electric Church Tour: One Night Only in select cities. Kravitz also had a prominent role in the Gap campaign of 2004–2005 as he modelled for the brand and his image was used in stores across North America as a major celebrity seal. Kravitz's single "Lady" was used very heavily in the company's "How Do You Wear It?" campaign and also filmed two commercials with Gap spokesmodel Sarah Jessica Parker playing the song to and dancing with Parker.

Reception

Initial critical response to Baptism ranged from average to negative. At Metacritic, which assigns a normalized rating out of 100 to reviews from mainstream critics, the album has received an average score of 43, based on 10 reviews.

Sal Cinquemani of Slant Magazine wrote "His highly stylized brand of retro rock has always been a guilty pleasure, even though it's been largely hit or miss, but with Baptism, Kravitz's seventh album, it's become sad and limp, like a wet, leftover noodle or a stash gone bad. He should just do a cover album and be done with it". Stephen Thomas Erlewine of AllMusic wrote "While these are fine individual moments, they wind up being a bit dispiriting since they're surrounded by lazy, exhausted retreads where it sounds as if the act of making music is a chore to Kravitz—something that he nearly admits in his lyrics. It's a shame and embarrassment, and hopefully it will be a temporary slump like Circus—unless he really does want to quit this business called show, since it would be better for him to stop making records than to crank out depressing sludge like this."

Ryan Lenz of Today added "Some have speculated that Kravitz is intent on cementing a place in the Rock and Roll Hall of Fame. For the fans, Baptism seems more intent on giving them something to worship." Kevin Forest Moreau of ShakingThrough.net wrote "Lenny Kravitz became a star by peddling familiar wares in a flashy package: If there was always an element of "Been there, heard that" in his rock, soul and funk classicism, Kravitz's craftsmanship and charisma were usually enough to carry the day. But those elements are critically missing from Baptism." Caroline Bansal of musicOMH added "The production is in fact what lets this album down. The mix is all wrong, with the drums far too high and the guitars way too low."

Track listing

Personnel
Musicians
 Lenny Kravitz – vocals, electric guitar , acoustic guitar , guitar solo , bass guitar , drums , piano , hand claps , Moog synthesizer and Mellotron , timpani , Hammond organ and wood block , synthesizer , string arrangement 
 Tawatha Agee – background vocals 
 Tyra Alston – handclaps 
 David Baron – baritone saxophone , string arrangement 
 Henry Hirsch – bass guitar , piano 
 Jay-Z – rap 
 Denine LaBat – handclaps 
 Norma Rodgers – handclaps 
 Craig Ross – electric guitar , guitar solo , drums , piano , tambourine 
 David Sanborn – saxophone 
 The Uncle Clappers (Uncle Bruce, Uncle Hans, Uncle Craig) – handclaps 
 David Whyko – handclaps 

Production
 Lenny Kravitz – producer, mixing
 Henry Hirsch – engineer, mixing
 Cyrille Taillandier – assistant engineer, Pro Tools engineer
 Ted Jensen – mastering

Charts

Weekly charts

Year-end charts

Certifications and sales

References

External links
 VH1 news story on Baptism

2004 albums
Lenny Kravitz albums
Virgin Records albums
Albums produced by Lenny Kravitz